Mehreen Pirzada (born 5 November 1995) is an Indian actress and model who predominantly appears in Telugu, Tamil, Hindi and Punjabi films. Pirzada made her acting debut in 2016 with the Telugu film Krishna Gaadi Veera Prema Gaadha. She made her Hindi debut with Phillauri and Tamil debut with Nenjil Thunivirundhal both in 2017. 

Pirzada has appeared in successful Telugu films including Mahanubhavudu (2017), Raja the Great (2017) and F2: Fun and Frustration (2019).She made her Punjabi film debut with DSP Dev in 2019.

Early life
Mehreen Pirzada was born on 5 November 1994 in Bathinda, Punjab, in a Sikh family to an agriculturist and realtor father Gurlal Pirzada and a housewife mother Paramjit Kaur Pirzada. Her only sibling is a brother named Gurfateh Pirzada who is also a model and actor.

Career

Modelling career

Pirzada did her first ramp walk at the age of ten and won the title of Kasauli Princess at a beauty pageant. She was later crowned Miss Personality South Asia Canada 2013 in Toronto. She modelled for popular designers through Jemini Face Modeling company and acted in many a commercial ads in Canada and India. She is also the Face of Dove India and endorses Nikon, Pears and Thums Up on TVC and print media.

Film career
Pirzada made her debut with the Telugu movie Krishna Gaadi Veera Prema Gaadha in which she played the character of Mahalakshmi. The movie was successful in Telugu states and at the US box office. In March 2017, she debuted in Hindi cinema with the movie Phillauri alongside Anushka Sharma, Diljit Dosanjh and Suraj Sharma. She appeared in 2019 in the film F2: Fun and Frustration. She also had a role in Ardab Mutiyaran as Shruti opposite Ninja and Sonam Bajwa.

Personal life 
In March 2021, Pirzada got engaged to Bhavya Bishnoi, son of Adampur, Hisar MLA Kuldeep Bishnoi, and grandson of former Haryana state Chief Minister Bhajan Lal. Their wedding was planned for late 2021, but was postponed due to the COVID-19 pandemic in India. The pair called off their engagement in early July 2021.

Filmography

Films

Music videos

Awards and nominations

References

External links
 
 
 

Living people
1995 births
Actresses in Telugu cinema
Actresses from Punjab, India
Indian film actresses
21st-century Indian actresses
People from Bathinda
Actresses in Tamil cinema
Actresses in Hindi cinema
Female models from Punjab, India
Punjabi people
Indian Sikhs
Zee Cine Awards Telugu winners